Bokito (born 14 March 1996) is a male western gorilla born in captivity, currently living in Diergaarde Blijdorp zoo in Rotterdam, the Netherlands. He became the subject of considerable media coverage after breaking out of his enclosure on 18 May 2007, abducting a female visitor and severely injuring her.

Bokito was born in the Zoologischer Garten, Berlin, Germany, and was abandoned by his mother at birth. He was then raised by human attendants. To avoid the risk of inbreeding, he was transferred to Rotterdam in August 2005, where the mauling incident later took place.

In November 2021, Bokito and other gorillas of his family became infected with the coronavirus.

Incidents

In mid-2004, Bokito escaped from his enclosure in Berlin and climbed its  wall. He was escorted back to his enclosure without further incident.

On 18 May 2007, Bokito responded to children throwing rocks at him by jumping over the water-filled ditch that separated his enclosure in Rotterdam from the public and violently attacked a woman, dragging her around for tens of metres and inflicting bone fractures as well as more than a hundred bite wounds. He subsequently entered a nearby restaurant, causing panic among the visitors. During this encounter, three more people were injured as a result of the panic. Bokito was eventually sedated with a tranquilizer gun and placed back in his cage.

The woman who was attacked had been a regular visitor to the great apes' enclosure, visiting an average of four times per week. She had a habit of touching the glass that separated the public from the gorillas, while making eye contact with Bokito and smiling at him. Although smiling is often associated with submissive or non-aggressive behavior in gorillas, eye contact is a practice that is discouraged by primatologists, as apes are likely to interpret eye contact as a challenge or a form of aggressive display. Zoo employees had previously warned her against doing this, but she continued, claiming a special bond with him: in an interview with De Telegraaf she said, "When I smile at him, he smiles back".

Aftermath
The week after Bokito's escape, a local health insurance company sponsored the production of 2,000 BokitoKijkers ("Bokito viewers"), paper visors which disguised the direction of the wearer's gaze. The visors were designed by advertising agency DDB Amsterdam, and won a Bronze Lion for promotional material at the 2008 Cannes Lions International Advertising Festival, and a Eurobest Silver at the 2007 Eurobest European Advertising Festival.

The word "bokitoproof", meaning "durable enough to resist the actions of an enraged gorilla" and by extension "durable enough to resist the actions of a non-specific extreme situation" was voted the Word of the Year for 2007 in the Netherlands.

Offspring
Bokito is the dominant male of his gorilla group. He has thus far fathered ten offspring with multiple females, born between October 2006 and February 2022. The main contender to his title as dominant male, Dango, was transferred to the Shanghai Zoo in 2007 along with his two primary female mates.

See also
Travis (chimpanzee)
List of individual apes

References

External links

 Rotterdam Zoo's current gorilla "family tree" (Flickr)
 Bokito at Gorilla Stud Book
 News story on Bokito's escape
News story on the aftermath of Bokito's escape
Printable "Bokito Viewer"

1996 animal births
Berlin Zoological Garden
Primate attacks
Individual gorillas
Missing or escaped animals
Individual animals in the Netherlands